The following are the football (soccer) events of the year 1926 throughout the world.

Events
PAOK FC was founded in Thessaloniki, Greece.
SC Lourinhanense was founded in Lisbon, Portugal.
 November 8 – APOEL FC is founded in Cyprus.

Winners club national championship
 Denmark: B1903
 England: Huddersfield Town
 Greece: Regional Championships:
EPSA (Athens) Panathinaikos
EPSP (Pireas)Olympiacos
EPSM (Thessaloniki) Aris
EPSP (Patras) A.P.S. Olympiakos Patras
 Iceland: KR
 Ireland: Shelbourne
 Italy: Juventus
 Kingdom of Serbs, Croats and Slovenes: Građanski Zagreb
 Netherlands: SC Enschede
 Poland: Pogoń Lwów
 Scotland:
Division One: Celtic F.C.
Scottish Cup: St. Mirren F.C.

International tournaments
 1926 British Home Championship (October 24, 1925 – April 17, 1926)

 1924-28 Nordic Football Championship (June 15, 1924 – October 7, 1928) 1926: (June 9 - October 3, 1926)
 (1926)
 (1924-1928)

 South American Championship 1926 in Chile (October 12, 1926 – November 3, 1926)

Births
 January 22 – Otto Hemele, Czech international footballer (died 2001)
 February 4 – Gyula Grosics, Hungarian international football player and manager (died 2014)
 May 1 – Doug Cowie, Scottish international footballer (died 2021)
 May 5 – Víctor Ugarte, Bolivian international footballer (died 1995)
 May 27 – Kees Rijvers, Dutch football player and manager
 June 19 – Juan Hohberg, Uruguayan international footballer (died 1996)
 June 19 – Julio Pérez, Uruguayan international footballer (died 2002)
 July 4 – Alfredo Di Stéfano, Argentine-Spanish international footballer and coach (died 2014)
 December 22 – Alcides Ghiggia, Uruguayan international footballer (died 2015)

Deaths

Clubs founded 
 APOEL FC
 ACF Fiorentina
 SSC Napoli
 PAOK FC

References 

 
Association football by year